Cantiga de amor (Portuguese and Galician) or cantiga d'amor (Galician-Portuguese), literally "love song", is a type of literary composition from the Middle Ages, typical of the medieval Galician-Portuguese lyric.

A male-voiced love lyric, they on average have more complex forms, many never found in cantigas de amigo and some highly complex ones that were directly inspired by Occitan and Old French lyrics. On the other hand, cantigas de amor have a lack of variation in personae – with the man almost always speaking to or about a woman – and of situations. Usually the man is courting the woman, complaining that she is being cruel to him, despite his love and loyalty, though sometimes he is leaving or coming back, is away from her, and, seldom, the man gets so frustrated, angry or jealous that he gives up on her and even insults the woman. Obscenity and open sexual references are taboo on this lyric.

Cantigas de amor have a more complex rhetoric, and there is far more variation in the relationship between metrical and syntactic units, with a much higher frequency of enjambement.

Scholars generally assume that the cantiga de amor comes from France. Scholars such as Henry R. Lang have pointed to clear thematic parallels between the cantiga de amor and Occitan and Old French lyrics. Cesare De Lollis pointed two erotic genres in Galician-Portuguese before the first written texts, and concluding that the cantiga de amor was written before the first extant cantiga de amigo, and that some elements of the cantiga de amor came before the Occitan and Old French influences. It is difficult to fully trace back the origins of the genre since it was highly influenced by foreign lyric compositions.

In popular culture 
In 1991, the Brazilian rock band Legião Urbana released their fifth album, V, which opened with the song titled Love Song. The song is the first stanza of Pois naci nunca vi Amor, a cantiga de amor written by Nuno Fernandes Torneol in the 13th century which tells the story of the character who since was born never saw love, but have heard about "him" and knows "he" wants to kill him. The character then begs his senhor ("lady", or his love interest) to show the killer or protect him.

See also 
 Galician-Portuguese lyric
 Cantiga de amigo
 Cantigas de escárnio e maldizer

References

Notes 

Galician-Portuguese
Poetic forms
Western medieval lyric forms